Hiroden Streetcar Route 7 (Yokogawa Station - Hiroden-honsha-mae route) runs between Yokogawa Station and Hiroden-honsha-mae Station.

Overview

Lines
Hiroden Streetcar route 7 is made up with next three lines. The train goes straight through from each direction.

█ Hiroden Yokogawa Line
█ Hiroden Main Line
█ Hiroden Ujina Line

Stations

References 

7